Sam Clancy (born May 29, 1958) is a former defensive end in the National Football League (NFL). He played for the Seattle Seahawks, Cleveland Browns, and Indianapolis Colts. He also played for the Pittsburgh Maulers and the Memphis Showboats of the United States Football League (USFL).

Prior to his professional football career, he was a standout college basketball player for the University of Pittsburgh and member of the Gold Medal winning 1979 U.S. Pan American Games Mens Basketball team; he played a season in the Continental Basketball Association for the Billings Volcanos in 1981–82, averaging 11.5 points and 8.3 rebounds per game.  He did not play football in college.

He has been an assistant coach for the Barcelona Dragons of NFL Europe, as well as the New Orleans Saints and Oakland Raiders.

Family
He has 2 sons, Sam Clancy Jr., who is a professional basketball player, Samario Clancy, who was a collegiate basketball player, and a daughter, Samantha Clancy.

References

External links
Raiders bio

1958 births
Living people
American football defensive ends
American football defensive tackles
Barcelona Dragons coaches
Basketball players at the 1979 Pan American Games
Basketball players from Pittsburgh
Billings Volcanos players
Cleveland Browns players
Indianapolis Colts players
Memphis Showboats players
New Orleans Saints coaches
Oakland Raiders coaches
Parade High School All-Americans (boys' basketball)
Phoenix Suns draft picks
Pittsburgh Maulers players
Pittsburgh Panthers men's basketball players
Players of American football from Pittsburgh
Seattle Seahawks players
Sportspeople from Pittsburgh
Pan American Games gold medalists for the United States
Pan American Games medalists in basketball
American men's basketball players
Medalists at the 1979 Pan American Games